Tko te ima, taj te nema is an album of  Zvonko Bogdan, a prominent folk singer from Vojvodina, Serbia. It was released in 2007 on the Croatia Records record label.

Track listing

 "Tko te ima, taj te nema" (B. Krstić/Z. Bogdan – B. Krstić/Z. Bogdan – J. Grcevich) – 3:18 
 "Živim život k'o skitnica" (Z. Bogdan – S. Mijatović – J. Grcevich) – 3:16 
 "Dunav teče niz panonske ravni" (Z. Bogdan – Z. Bogdan – J. Grcevich) – 3:16 
 "Doći ću ti k'o u staroj pismi" (Z. Bogdan – Z. Bogdan – J. Grcevich) – to4:25 
 "Oj Dunave teci, teci" (Traditional – Traditional – J. Grcevich) – 3:35 
 "Ova naša livada/Seoska sam lola/Temerav/Četir' konja debela" (Traditional – Traditional – J. Grcevich) – 5:43 
 "Od danas te draga više ljubit neću" (Traditional – Traditional – J. Grcevich) – 2:05 
 "Evo banke/Nema ljepše djevojke" (Traditional – Traditional/Z. Bogdan – J. Grcevich) – 3:19 
 "Duge su mi noći" (Z. Bogdan – Z. Bogdan – J. Grcevich) – 2:22 
 "U tom Somboru" (Traditional – Traditional – J. Grcevich) – 2:28 
 "Ta tvoja suknja plava" (B. Remenji – Z. Bogdan – J. Grcevich) – 1:42 
 "Bunjevačko prelo" (Z. Bogdan – Z. Bogdan – J. Grcevich) – 6:17 
 "Večernji zvon" (Traditional – Traditional -J. Grcevich) – 2:59 
 "(Šokački) Bećarac" (Traditional – Z. Bogdan – J. Grcevich) – 3:25 
 "Svirci moji" (S. Leopold – D. Britvić – J. Grcevich) – 3:31

Credits 
 Zvonko Bogdan – vocals
 Studijski tamburaški ansambl J. Grchevicha 
 Jerry Grchevich – prim, basprim, čelo
 Damir Mihovec – basprim
 Denis Špegelj – basprim
 Darko Dervišević – bugarija
 Željko Miloš – berda

2007 albums
Zvonko Bogdan albums